Euphaedra semipreussiana, the Korup orange forester, is a butterfly in the family Nymphalidae. It is found in Nigeria and Cameroon. The habitat consists of forests.

References

Butterflies described in 1993
semipreussiana